Always on My Mind is an album by saxophonist Houston Person featuring jazz versions of pop hits recorded in 1985 and released on the Muse label early the following year.

Track listing 
 "I Can't Help Myself" (Brian Holland, Lamont Dozier, Eddie Holland) − 4:30
 "Always on My Mind" (Johnny Christopher, Mark James, Wayne Carson) − 5:28
 "Endlessly" (Brook Benton, Clyde Otis) − 7:08
 "How Do You Keep the Music Playing?" (Michel Legrand, Alan Bergman, Marilyn Bergman) − 6:14
 "Cutie Pie" (Al Hudson, Dave Roberson, George Morgan, Corky Meadows, Terence Dudle) − 5:35
 "I Might Be You (Theme from Tootsie)" (Dave Grusin, Alan Bergman, Marilyn Bergman) − 5:58

Personnel 
Houston Person − tenor saxophone 
David Braham − organ, electric piano
Ted Brancato − piano, keyboards
Wilbur Bascomb − bass
Bernard Purdie − drums
Ralph Dorsey − percussion

References 

Houston Person albums
1986 albums
Muse Records albums